The 1981 IAAF World Race Walking Cup was held on 3 and 4 October 1981 in the streets of Valencia, Spain. The event was also known as IAAF Race Walking World Cup.

Complete results were published.

Medallists

Results

Men's 20 km

Men's 50 km

Team (men)
The team rankings, named Lugano Trophy, combined the 20km and 50km events team results.

Women's 5 km

Team (women)

Participation
The participation of 160 athletes (111 men/49 women) from 18 countries is reported.

 (8/4)
 (4/4)
 (3/-)
 (8/-)
 (-/4)
 (8/-)
 (8/4)
 (8/2)
 (8/-)
 (8/4)
 (8/-)
 (8/4)
 (8/4)
 (8/4)
 (-/3)
 (8/4)
 (8/4)
 (-/4)

Qualifying rounds 
From 1961 to 1985 there were qualifying rounds for the men's competition with the first two winners proceeding to the final.  This year, México, the Soviet Union, the German Democratic Republic, Italy, Spain, the United States, Australia, Canada, and China proceeded directly to the final.

Zone 1
Saint-Aubin-lès-Elbeuf, France, September 5/6

Zone 2
Helsinki, Finland, August 29/30

Zone 3
Szolnok, Hungary, August 29

References

External links
IAAF World Race Walking Cup 1961-2006 Facts & Figures - IAAF.org

World Athletics Race Walking Team Championships
World Race Walking Cup
World Race Walking Cup
Walking Cup
IAAF World Race Walking Cup